Margarites huloti is a species of sea snail, a marine gastropod mollusk in the family Margaritidae.

Description
The maximum measured height of the shell is 12.5 mm, and its diameter 13.4 mm.

Distribution
This species occurs in the Pacific Ocean off a methane seep near Chile.

References

 Vilvens C. & Sellanes J. (2006). Descriptions of Otukaia crustulum new species (Gastropoda: Trochoidea: Calliostomatidae) and Margarites huloti new species (Gastropoda: Trochoidea: Trochidae) from a methane seep area off Chile. The Nautilus 120 (1): 15–20 
 Bouchet, P.; Fontaine, B. (2009). List of new marine species described between 2002–2006. Census of Marine Life.

huloti
Gastropods described in 2006
Endemic fauna of Chile